In the 21st century, the Government of Egypt has given greater priority to improving the education system. According to the Human Development Index (HDI), Egypt is ranked 115 in the HDI, and 9 in the lowest 10 HDI countries in the Middle East and Northern Africa, in 2014. With the help of the World Bank and other multilateral organizations Egypt aims to increase access in early childhood to care and education and the inclusion of Information and Communication Technology (ICT) at all levels of education, especially at the tertiary level. The government is responsible for offering free education at all levels. The current overall expenditure on education is about 12.6 percent as of 2007.  Investment in education as a percentage of GDP rose to 4.8 in 2005 but then fell to 3.7 in 2007.  The Ministry of Education is also tackling a number of issues: trying to move from a highly centralized system to offering more autonomy to individual institutions, thereby increasing accountability. The Human Rights Measurement Initiative finds that Egypt is achieving 89.3% of what should be possible for the right to education, at their level of income.

Education system 
The public education system in Egypt consists of three levels: the basic education stage for 4–14 years old: kindergarten for two years followed by primary school for six years and preparatory school (ISCED Level 2) for three years. Then, the secondary school (ISCED Level 3) stage is for three years, for ages 15 to 17, followed by the tertiary level. Education is made compulsory for 9 academic years between the ages of 4 and 14. Moreover, all levels of education are free within any government-run schools. According to the World Bank, there are great differences in the educational attainment of the rich and the poor, also known as the "wealth gap." Although the median years of school completed by the rich and the poor is only one or two years but the wealth gap reaches as high as nine or ten years. In the case of Egypt, the wealth gap was a modest 3 years in the mid-1990s. 

Egypt launched its National Strategic Plan for Pre-University Education Reform (2007/08 – 2011/12). The Strategic Plan (which has the subtitle ‘Towards an educational paradigm shift’) mirrors Egypt's commitment to a comprehensive, sustainable, and collective approach towards ensuring education of quality for all and developing a knowledge society. Its key elements are: access and participation; teachers; pedagogy; curriculum and learning assessment; textbooks and learning materials; management and governance; and a quality improvement strategy.

Promotional examinations are held at all levels except in grades 6 and 9 at the basic education level and grade 12 in the secondary stage, which apply standardized regional or national exams. The Ministry of Education is responsible for making decisions about the education system with the support of three Centers: the National Center of Curricula Development, the National Center for Education Research, and the National Center for Examinations and Educational Evaluation. Each center has its own focus in formulating education policies with other state-level committees. On the other hand, the Ministry of Higher Education supervises the higher education system.

There is also
a formal teacher's qualification track in place for basic and secondary education levels. The teachers are required to complete four years of pre-service courses at university to enter the teaching profession. Specifically with respect to teacher's professional development to raise mathematics, science and technology teaching standards, the Professional Academy for Teachers offer several programs. Local teachers also take part in the international professional training programs.

Starting in 2007, the Ministries of Education, Finance, and Local Development (and others) started informal discussions to experiment with the decentralization of education. Working groups were established to make more formal proposals. Proposals included ideas for starting with recurrent expenditures, using a simple and transparent formula for carrying out fiscal transfers, and making sure that transfers would reach the school itself.

During 2008 design was carried out, three pilot governorates (Faiyum, Ismailia, and Luxor) were chosen, and monitoring and capacity building processes and manuals were agreed upon. The formula is quite simple, and includes enrolment, poverty, and stage of education as drivers.

During 2009 funding was decentralized all the way to the school level, and schools began to receive funding. As of late 2009, the pilot showed few if any problems, and the expected results were materializing quite well, in terms of stimulating community participation, allowing schools to spend more efficiently and assess their own priorities, and increasing the seriousness of school-based planning by creating a means to finance such plans, among other expected results.  An informal assessment of the pilot revealed that the funding formula money precipitated an increase in the community donations.  The survey results show that the ratio of the median values of community donations of the pilot year to the previous year was 2.20.

Parallel to these efforts in the education sector, other sectors (for example, certain aspects of housing and municipal services) in Egypt are planning to decentralize decision-making and spending, now nationwide (without a pilot stage in limited governorates), in a phased approach. Education plans to be one of the lead sectors in this process. In addition to administrative and financial decentralization, there is an increasing emphasis on involving elected local popular councils (which exist at governorate and district level) in the horizontal oversight of expenditure and planning across the decentralizing sectors, and as they come on stream in the decentralization process. Within the education sector, as of late 2009 plans are being made to decentralize certain lines of funding and planning for capital equipment and infrastructure, in all governorates, all the way to school level in the case of smaller units of capital equipment, or levels higher than the school for items such as new infrastructure. The education sector does expect to continue to use the original 3 pilot governorates as a special observatory to assess and understand how well the process is proceeding.

History of education in Egypt 
Modern education was introduced under the auspices of Ottoman Pasha Muhammad Ali who reigned 1805–1848. He started a dual system of education at the time: one serving the message attending traditional schools (Mansourya) and another called Madrasa (Arabic word for school) for the elite civil servants. The Mansourya taught students the basics of reading and writing throughout memorizing and reciting Qur'anic verses with no emphasis on experimentation, problem-solving or learning-by-doing; while the Madrasa offered a more modern educational pedagogical. Ali Pasha sent two organized student missions to study in Paris. French involvement in Egyptian education was not initially a government project, but rather evolved to become a government project by the end of the Pasha's rule. The first mission was a personal venture to keep the spirit of the 1798 Napoleonic expedition alive through informal cultural imperialism. The French government was involved in the second student mission of 1844. It was motivated by their colonial interests in North Africa.

During the period of British rule in Egypt, the educational system remained neglected by the colonial government. The longest-serving British resident in Egypt, Lord Cromer had a negative experience with education in India, where European-style educational institutions had fomented political unrest and nationalistic sentiments. In Egypt, Cromer reduced the budget for education, closed many of the specialized postsecondary institutions, and refocused the curriculum on vocational topics. Tuition fees were introduced, which reduced the availability for most Egyptians to attend school. These measures were reduced after he left Egypt and retired in 1907.

Demographics

The overall literacy rate in Egypt is 72 percent as of 2010, being 80.3% for males
and 63.5% for females. There is special attention given by the government and other NGOs to reduce gender disparity in education and to achieve the 2015 Millennium Development Goal of universal primary education.

The Egyptian educational system is highly centralized, and is divided into three stages: khara

 Basic Education (transliteration: al-Taʿlīm al-Asāsī)
 Primary Stage
 Preparatory Stage
 Secondary Education (transliteration: al-Taʿlīm al-Thānawī)
 Post-Secondary education (transliteration: al-Taʿlīm al-Gāmiʿī)

Since Egypt's extension of the free compulsory education law in 1981 to include the Preparatory Stage, both Primary and Preparatory phases (Ages 6 through 14) have been combined under the label Basic Education. Education beyond this stage depends on the student's ability.
Many private schools offer additional educational programs, along with the national curriculum, such as the American High School Diploma, the British IGCSE system, the French baccalauréat, the German Abitur and the International Baccalaureate.
These are the types of private schools in Egypt.

Basic education
The basic education consists of pre-primary, primary and preparatory levels of education (ISCED Level 0, 1, 2). In Egypt, the Ministry of Education coordinates the preschool education. In 1999-2000 the total enrollment rate of pre-primary students was 16 percent and that increased to 24 percent in 2009.  Irrespective of private or state run, all preschool institutions come under the Ministry of Education. It is the Ministry's duty to select and distribute textbooks. According to the Ministry's guidelines, the maximum size of a preschool should not exceed more than 45 students. Ministry of Education is also getting support from the international agencies, such as the World Bank to enhance the early childhood education system by increasing access to schools, improving quality of education and building capacity of teachers
At the primary level (ISCED Level 1) students could attend private, religious or government schools. Currently, there are 7.8 percent of students enrolled at primary level in private schools as of 2007. The total enrollment of students at primary level is 105 percent in 2007.  The examinations at grade 3 are on district (edara) level. Though there is a push for Egyptian children to attend primary school, educators are often ill-equipped to teach them. As of 1995, a mere 7 percent of primary school teachers in Egypt had received a university degree; the remaining 93 percent only had nine years of formal education.
 
The second tier of basic compulsory education equivalent to (ISCED Level 2) is the 'preparatory stage' or 'lower secondary' which is three years long. Completion of this tier grants students the Basic Education Completion Certificate. The importance of completion of this level of education is to safeguard students against illiteracy as early drop outs at this stage easily recede into illiteracy and eventually poverty.

Secondary education
After completing the Egyptian middle school with a national exam, the student moves to the secondary stage with its different path according to their results in the exam  Secondary education consists of Two tracks: general, and technical . The general secondary stage includes 3 years of education, whereas the Technical schools track could last for 3–5 years. The types of technical schools in Egypt are divided into industrial, agricultural and commercial technical schools and some of them apply the dual system. Recently, the Egyptian state introduced schools with a new system called Applied Technology Schools .The Government of Egypt has undertaken some initiatives to strengthen the management and reform of the TVET system. In 2006, the Industrial Training Council (ITC) was created through a ministerial decree with a mandate to improve coordination and direction of all training-related entities, projects, and policies in the Ministry. Its action is framed by the global "Technical Education Strategy" (2011/2012-2016/2017). The focus on technical education and training aims at resolving the issue faced by most firms to employ skilled work force: According to the Enterprise Surveys in 2007, 31 percent of the firms in Egypt identify labor skill level as the major constraint of doing business in the country.

 Al-Azhar system 
Another system that runs in parallel with the public educational system is known as the Al-Azhar system. It consists of  six years of primary stage, a three-year preparatory stage and finally three years of secondary stage. The Ministry of education reduced the number of secondary school years from four to three years in 1998, so as to align the Al Azhar system with the general secondary education system.   In this system as well, there are separate schools for girls and boys. Al Azhar education system is supervised by the Supreme Council of the Al-Azhar Institution. The Azhar Institution itself is nominally independent from the Ministry of Education, but is ultimately under supervision by the Egyptian Prime Minister. Al Azhar schools are named "Institutes" and include primary, preparatory, and secondary phases. All schools in all stages teach religious subjects and non-religious subjects. The bulk of the curriculum, however, consists of religious subjects as described below. All the students are Muslims. Al-Azhar schools are all over the country, especially in rural areas. The graduates of Al-Azhar secondary schools are eligible to continue their studies at the Al-Azhar University.  As of 2007 and 2008, there are 8272 Al-Azhar schools in Egypt. In the early 2000s, Al-Azhar schools accounted for less than 4% of the total enrollment. The graduates of this system  are then automatically accepted into Al-Azhar University.In 2007, the Pre-University enrollment in Al- Azhar institutes is about 1,906,290 students.

Higher education system

Egypt has a very extensive higher education system. About 30% of all Egyptians in the relevant age group go to university. However, only half of them graduate.

The Ministry of Higher Education supervises the tertiary level of education. There are a number of universities catering to students in diverse fields. In the current education system, there are 17 public universities, 51 public non-university institutions, 16 private universities and 89 private higher institutions. Out of the 51 non –university institutions, 47 are two-year middle technical institutes (MTIs) and four are 4–5 years higher technical institutes’.  The higher education cohort is expected to increase by close to 6 percent (60,000) students per annum through 2009.

In 1990, a legislation was passed to provide greater autonomy to the universities. But still the education infrastructure, equipment and human resources are not in place to cater to the rising higher education students. Gross enrollment in tertiary education increased from 27 percent in 2003 to 31 percent in 2005. But there has not been a similar increase in spending on improving the higher education system in terms of introduction of new programs and technologies. Both at national level (inspection systems, examinations) and at local level (school level student assessments) measures of the success of education strategies and the performance of the system are weak. The inspectorate system does not provide either solid technical support to school staff, nor an effective monitoring mechanism for failing schools. The examination system at the end of preparatory and secondary levels—Thanaweyya Amma, does not measure higher-order thinking skills, but concentrates rather on rote memorization. Scores can thus be raised significantly by exam specific tutoring, therefore, students with more resources can afford private tutoring which helps them to score higher on the national standardized exams and hence are accepted in top universities in Egypt. Hence, this competitive process of selection restricts students' degree options and results, hence making students opt for programs and careers which are of little interest to them.

The Egyptian tertiary education is steered by a centralized system with institutions having little control on the decisions of the curriculum, program development and deployment of staff and faculty. Improving system governance and efficiency is an imperative that takes on added urgency given that a significant population bulge has reached the higher education system. The actual number of students entering higher education grew by 18 percent per year between 1992/93 and 1997/98. The consequence was a sharp decline in per student spending of around 40 percent in real terms over that period. The higher education cohort is projected to continue to increase by close to 6 percent (60,000 students) per annum through 2009. This means that significant efficiencies will need to be introduced into the system just to maintain quality at its current inadequate level. The performance and quality of higher education is currently severely compromised by overly centralized order to improve the already outdated system, rigid curriculum and teaching practices. Improving system governance and efficiency is an imperative that takes on added urgency given that a significant population bulge has reached the higher education system. The actual number of students entering higher education grew by 17 percent per year between 1992/93 and 1997/98. The consequence was a sharp decline in per student spending of around 40 percent in real terms over that period. The higher education cohort is projected to continue to increase by close to 6 percent (60,000 students) per annum through 2009. This means that significant efficiencies will need to be introduced into the system just to maintain quality at its current inadequate level.

The Government of Egypt recognizes that there are real challenges to be faced in the sector, foremost amongst which are the need to significantly improve sector governance and efficiency, increase institutional autonomy, significantly improve the quality and relevance of higher education programs, and maintain coverage at existing levels. Recent Government actions to build political consensus on issues critical to reform have created a climate that is ripe for change. The Ministry of Higher Education (MOHE) acts as a champion for reform. The Minister, appointed in 1997, quickly established a committee for the reform of higher education (known as the HEEP Committee) which drew in a wide range of stakeholders including industrialists and parliamentarians. A National Conference on higher education reform was held in February 2000, and a Declaration for action emanating from the Conference was endorsed by the President and the Prime Minister. The Declaration identified 25 specific reform initiatives. The Bank agrees with, and supports, the Declaration. A range of multilateral and bilateral agencies, including the World Bank, also concur with the Declaration's proposals, and are committed to supporting various aspects of the reform process.

The Government's Higher Education Reform Strategy Egyptian higher education reform strategy included 25 projects addressing all the reform domains, is implemented over three phases until 2017, and corresponds to the government's five-year plans as follows:

First phase from 2002 to 2007

Second phase from 2007 to 2012

Third phase from 2012 to 2017

Priority has been given to 12 projects in the first phase of implementation (2002–2007) and were integrated into the following six projects:
HEEP Six Priority Projects (2002–2007)

Higher Education Enhancement Project Fund (HEEPF),

Information and Communications Technology Project (ICTP),

Egyptian Technical Colleges Project (ETCP),

Faculty of Education Project (FOEP),

Faculty Leaders Development Project (FLDP),

Quality Assurance and Accreditation Project (QAAP).

In August 2004, HEEP strategic priorities were adjusted to become responsive to the requirements of quality and accreditation and to correspond to the government's approach to improving scientific research. The adjustment added two more dimensions: first, developing post graduate studies and scientific research and second, addressing students’ extra-curricular activities in addition to the continued implementation of the six prioritized programs during the first phase. Due to the dynamic nature of the reform strategy, which entails reconsidering priorities for each period, a Strategic Planning Unit (SPU) was established for the MOHE to ensure the sustainability of planning and project monitoring during the three phases and for future ones. A Students’ Activity Project (SAP) was also initiated as part of program accreditation similar to scientific research and post graduate studies.
There are both private and public institutions of higher education in Egypt. Public higher education is free in Egypt, and Egyptian students only pay registration fees. Private education is much more expensive.

In 2019, the unemployment rate of university graduates in Egypt reached 36.1%, according to CAPMAS. The agency added that 25.1% of this rate was males, while the females formed 53.2%.

The COVID-19 Pandemic has had a strong influence on the Egyptian educational system and the rise of distance education. The results of a study on a sample of 147 students showed that students appreciated comfort in the home environment, saving time and effort, and having better access to learning resource.

 International education 
As of January 2015, the International Schools Consultancy (ISC) listed Egypt as having 184 international schools. ISC defines an 'international school' in the following terms "ISC includes an international school if the school delivers a curriculum to any combination of pre-school, primary or secondary students, wholly or partly in English outside an English-speaking country, or if a school in a country where English is one of the official languages, offers an English-medium curriculum other than the country's national curriculum and is international in its orientation." This definition is used by publications including The Economist.

 Agricultural education 
The Egyptian Ministry of Education (MoE) aiming to develop agricultural knowledge and skills among young people set up by 2010/2011 133 secondary agricultural schools 133 in different cities and districts. Agricultural education is divided into a three-year and a five-year system. Both 3 year and 5 year options provide theoretical information taught in the classroom and practical aspects taught in laboratories, workshops and farms. These schools coordinate with the Ministry of Agriculture to provide training opportunities for teaching staff about technical farming issues at agricultural research centres. Farming plots are provided to schools and to offer job opportunities to graduates at institutions affiliated to the Ministry of Agriculture.

 Challenges 
Although significant progress has been made to increase human capital base through improved education system, still the quality of education experience is low and unequally distributed. Due to lack of good quality education at the basic and secondary levels, there has been a mushrooming market for private tutoring. Now to take private tuition has become more of an obligation than a remedial activity. According to the Egypt Human Development Report (2005), 58 percent of surveyed families stated that their children take private tutoring. The CAPMAS (2004) survey showed that households spend on average around 61 percent of total education expenditure on private tutoring. In addition, per household expenditure of the richest quintile on private tutoring is more than seven times that of the poorest. Among the issues is the lack of sufficient education in public schools and the need for private tuition. As of 2005, 61-70% of Egyptian students attend private tuition. Other common issues include: theft of public educational funds and leakage of exams.
 
Egypt also has a shortage of skilled and semi-skilled workforce. But there has been an abundance of low-skilled laborers. Even if there are any high-skilled workers available, their quality of training is quite poor. This is mostly a problem in small-medium companies and large public industries that work in "protected" domestic markets. The average gross production per worker is lower than other North African countries: Morocco and Tunisia. Youth unemployment is also very high, primarily due to lack of education system in providing necessary training under TVET programs.

Egyptian education faces a main challenge because of the quality of teachers that teach in public schools. An ethnography study conducted by Sarah Hartmann in 2008 concluded that most teachers in Egypt resort to teaching for lack of better options and because the nature of the job does not conflict with their more important gender role as mothers. The low salaries offered by the public schooling system in Egypt attracts low-skilled employees. A study conducted in 1989 documenting the bureaucracy of the Egyptian Ministry of Education concluded that teachers' annual salary in Egypt is, on average, $360. A later study conducted in 2011 showed that teachers earn an average annual salary of $460 which is less than half the country's average annual per-capita income. Following the low quality of teachers in Egypt, they lack basic psychological background that would allow them to deal with students. Corporal punishment is a common practice in Egyptian schools even though it has not been deeply discussed in literature. An example was brought to the media's attention in 2011 when a pre-K teacher was caught on video consistently beating his students harshly.

A study conducted by UNESCO on educational equity in world's 16 most populous countries placed Egypt in the middle range in terms of equity of primary and secondary enrollments across governorates in Egypt.  But when the wealth component is added to education attainment, the results are not very encouraging. There are significantly higher enrollment rates in wealthier regions at both the primary and secondary levels. This confirms that more efforts are needed to reduce the wealth gap in educational attainment.

 Holidays 
Academic weekly holidays are on Fridays and sometimes, in addition to, either Thursdays or Saturdays.

In addition to some of the state official holidays, religious or secular, there are two main vacations. The school summer vacation starts at the beginning or middle of June and ends around the middle of September. Winter vacation starts from the middle of January and goes to the beginning of February.

See also

 Francophonie, an organization of which Egypt is a member state
 List of Egyptian universities
 Academic Freedom in the Middle East
 Ali Pasha Mubarak
 Isma‘il al-Qabbani

References

Further reading
 Adal, Raja. Beauty in the Age of Empire: Japan, Egypt, and the Global History of Aesthetic Education. Columbia University Press, 2019.
 Cook, Bradley J. "Doing educational research in a developing country: Reflections on Egypt." Compare: A Journal of Comparative and International Education 28.1 (1998): 93–103.
 Faksh, Mahmud A. "An historical survey of the educational system in Egypt." International review of education (1976): 234–244.
 Faksh, Mahmud A. "The chimera of education for development in Egypt: the socio‐economic roles of university graduates." Middle Eastern Studies 13.2 (1977): 229–240.
 Herrera, Linda. "Higher education in the Arab world." in International handbook of higher education. Springer, Dordrecht, 2007. 409–421.
 Heyworth-Dunne, James. An Introduction to the History of Education in Modern Egypt. Routledge, 2019.
 Krapp, Stefanie. "The educational and vocational training system in Egypt: Development, structure, problems." International journal of sociology 29.1 (1999): 66–96.
 Radwan, A. (1951) Old and New Forces of Egyptian Education in Egypt. Teachers College, Columbia University Press.
 Russell, Mona L. "Competing, overlapping, and contradictory agendas: Egyptian education under British occupation, 1882-1922." Comparative Studies of South Asia, Africa and the Middle East 21.1 (2001): 50–60.
 Saleh, Mohamed. "Public Mass Modern Education, Religion, and Human Capital in Twentieth-Century Egypt." Journal of Economic History 76.3 (2016): 697–735.
 Williamson, Bill. Education and social change in Egypt and Turkey: A study in historical sociology. Springer, 1987.
 Yousef, Hoda A. "Seeking the Educational Cure: Egypt and European Education, 1805-1920s." European Education'' 44.4 (2012): 51–66.